The 1975 Gator Bowl was a college football bowl game played between the Maryland Terrapins and the Florida Gators on December 29, 1975. Maryland won the game by a score of 13–0.

References

Gator Bowl
Gator Bowl
Florida Gators football bowl games
Maryland Terrapins football bowl games
20th century in Jacksonville, Florida
December 1975 sports events in the United States
Gator Bowl